Paspalum floridanum is a species of grass known by the common name Florida paspalum. It is native to the eastern United States.

This rhizomatous perennial grass has stems which can exceed two meters in height. The leaf blades are up to 52 centimeters long and may be hairless to hairy, with a dense coating of hairs behind the ligules. The inflorescence is a panicle with up to 6 branches. The paired spikelets are generally oval in shape and measure a few millimeters long.

This grass grows in disturbed, wet habitat types such as ditches. It grows in woods and marshy areas.

The seeds provide food for birds.

References

External links
USDA Plants Profile
NatureServe

floridanum
Flora of North America
Plants described in 1803